Karl August Folkers (September 1, 1906 – December 7, 1997) was an American biochemist who made major contributions to the isolation and identification of bioactive natural products.

Career
Folkers graduated from the College of Liberal Arts and Sciences at the University of Illinois in 1928. In 1986, the institution awarded him its Alumni Achievement Award.

His career was mainly spent at Merck. He played a prominent role in the isolation of vitamin B12 in 1947, which is one of the most structural complex of the vitamins. As a Merck Pharmaceuticals research team, Folkers, Fern P. Rathe, and Edward Anthony Kaczka were the first to isolate the antibiotic cathomycin in 1955. His team also isolated the antibiotic cycloserine. In 1958 his Merck team determined the structure of coenzyme Q10.

He later served as director of the Institute of Biomedical Research at the University of Texas at Austin, where he was also Ashbel Smith Professor of Chemistry.

In recognition for his scientific contributions, he received the Perkin Medal in 1960, the William H. Nichols Medal in 1967, the Priestley Medal in 1986, and the National Medal of Science in 1990.

References

External links
 Karl August Folkers, biographical memoir by William Shive

1906 births
1997 deaths
20th-century American biochemists
National Medal of Science laureates
Vitamin researchers
Merck & Co. people
University of Texas at Austin faculty
University of Illinois alumni